
This is a list of people, places, and events related to the medieval Bulgarian Empires — the First Bulgarian Empire (681–1018), and the Second Bulgarian Empire (1185–1396).

Notes
 Feel free to add more, and create missing pages. For further information on that era, see the Index of Byzantine Empire-related articles.
 People are listed by first name. Events, monuments and institutions like "Battle/Siege/Council/Church/Duchy/etc. of NNN" are listed by the location/name.

Index

A

  Achelous (917), Battle of  
  Adrianople (1205), Battle of 
  Adrianople (1254), Battle of  
  Adrianople (813), Siege of  
  Agatha, wife of Edward the Exile 
  Agatha, wife of Samuel of Bulgaria 
  Ajjar
  Ajtony
  Albania under the Bulgarian Empire 
  Aldimir 
  Alexius Slav 
  Alexander (son of Ivan Shishman) 
  Alogobotur 
  Alusian of Bulgaria 
  Anchialus (708), Battle of 
  Anchialus (763), Battle of 
  Andronikos Asen
  Anevo Fortress  
  Anna (Anisia) 
  Anna (daughter of Boris I)
  Anna Neda of Serbia 
  Anna Maria of Hungary  
  Anna of Wallachia 
  Anna Terter of Bulgaria 
  Anna-Theodora Asenina of Bulgaria 
  Arcadiopolis (970), Battle of 
  Arcadiopolis (1194), Battle of 
  Archbishopric of Ohrid 
  Aron 
  Asen dynasty 
  Asen's Fortress  
  Asen and Peter, Uprising of  
  Asparukh 
  Avars

B

  Baba Vida  
  Bachkovo Monastery 
  Baldwin's Tower
  Ballshi Inscription
  Ban (title)
  Basil I of Bulgaria
  Basil II of Bulgaria
  Batbayan 
  Belaur
  Belogradchik Fortress  
  Beloslava of Bulgaria 
  Berziti 
  Berzitia, Battle of 
  Beshevliev, Veselin
  Bitola (1015), Battle of 
  Bitola inscription
  Bogomil (priest) 
  Bogomilism 
  Boila
  Boril
  Boril, book of
  Boris I 
  Boris II 
  Boruy, Battle of
  Boulgarophygon, Battle of
  Boyana Church
  Boyar
  Bozhenishki Urvich
  Braničevci
  Bulgaria
  Bulgaria (theme)
  Bulgaria, Byzantine conquest of
  Bulgaria, Christianization of
  Bulgaria, Sviatoslav's invasion of
  Bulgarian army, medieval
  Bulgarian coinage, medieval
  Bulgarian Empire
  Bulgarian Empire, First
  Bulgarian Empire, Second
  Bulgarian khans, Nominalia of the
  Bulgarian literature, medieval
  Bulgarian navy, medieval
  Bulgarian royal charters, medieval
  Bulgarians
  Bulgars
  Byalgrad  
  Byzantine Empire, Bulgarian wars with
  Byzantine Empire, 894–896 war with
  Byzantine Empire, 913–927 war with
  Byzantine civil war of 1321–28
  Byzantine civil war of 1341–47

C

  Catherine of Bulgaria
  Chaka
  Chatalar Inscription
  Chernomen, Battle of
  Chernomen, Treaty of
  Chernorizets Hrabar
  Cherven (fortress)  
  Christ Pantocrator (Nesebar), Church of
  Clement of Ohrid
  Codex Assemanius
  Codex Marianus
  Codex Suprasliensis
  Codex Zographensis
  Cometopuli dynasty
  Comita Nikola
  Constantine II
  Constantine of Kostenets
  Constantine of Preslav
  Constantine Tikh Asen
  Constantinople (922), Battle of
  Constantinople (717-718), Siege of
  Constantinople (1235), Siege of
  Cosmas the Priest
  Croatian–Bulgarian battle of 927
  Croatia, Bulgarian wars with
  Cuman Tsaritsa of Bulgaria, The
  Cumans
  Cyprian, Metropolitan of Moscow
  Cyrillic script
  Cyrillic alphabet, early

D

  Darman and Kudelin
  Daskal Philip Psalter
  David
  Dejan (magnate)
  Demetrius of Bulgaria
  St Demetrius (Patalenitsa), Church of
  St Demetrius of Thessaloniki (Veliko Tarnovo), Church of
  Desislava of Bulgaria
  Despot (court title)
  Devina, Battle of
  Devingrad
  Devol (Albania)
  Dionisiy Divniy
  Dobreyshovo Gospels
  Dobromir Chrysos
  Dobrotitsa
  Dorotheus of Bulgaria
  Dobruja, Despotate of
  Dorostolon, Siege of
  Dragana of Serbia
  Drougoubitai
  Dorothea of Bulgaria
  Dulo clan
  Dyrrhachium (1018), Battle of

E

  Elena Asenina of Bulgaria
  Elena of Bulgaria
  Elemag
  Elisabeth of Courtenay
  Enina Apostle
  Enravota
  Euphrosyne of Bulgaria
  Evtimiy of Tarnovo

F
  Fruzhin

G

  Gate of Trajan  
  Gates of Trajan, Battle of the
  Gavril Radomir
  George Sursuvul
  George Terter I
  George Terter II
  St George (Kyustendil), Church of
  Georgi Voiteh
  Georgi Voiteh, Uprising of
  Gigen
  Glad
  Glagolitic alphabet
  Gostun
  Grand Župan
  Gregory of Bulgaria
  Gregory the Bulgarian
  Gregory of Sinai
  Gregory Tsamblak
  Gyuzelev, Vasil

H

  Hagia Sophia Church, Nesebar
  Hagia Sophia Church, Sofia
  Helena of Bulgaria
  Holy Archangels Michael and Gabriel (Nesebar), Church of the
  Holy Ascension of God, Patriarchal Cathedral of the
  Holy Mother of God (Asen's Fortress), Church of the
  Holy Mother of God (Donja Kamenica), Church of the
  Holy Mother of God Eleusa (Nesebar), Church of the
  Holy Forty Martyrs (Veliko Tarnovo), Church of the
  Holy Trinity, Patriarchal Monastery of the
  Hranislav
  Hrelyo
  Hungary, Bulgarian wars with

I

  Ichirgu-boil
  Ignatius of Bulgaria
  Ihtiman, Battle of
  Irene Doukaina Laskarina
  Irene Komnene Doukaina
  Irene Lekapene
  Irene of Larissa
  Irene Palaiologina
  Isbul
  Ivan II
  Ivan Alexander
  Ivan Asen I
  Ivan Asen II
  Ivan Asen III
  Ivan Asen IV
  Ivan Asen V
  Ivan Shishman
  Ivan Sratsimir
  Ivan Stephen
  Ivan the Russian
  Ivan Vladislav
  Ivanko of Bulgaria
  Ivanko (despot)
  Ivanovo, Rock-hewn Churches of
  Ivats
  Ivaylo
  Ivaylo, Uprising of

J

  Jacob Svetoslav
  Jeremiah (Bulgarian priest)
  Joachim I of Bulgaria
  Joachim II of Bulgaria
  Joachim III of Bulgaria
  John the Exarch
  John Komnenos Asen
  John Kukuzelis
  John of Debar
  John of Rila
  Joseph II of Constantinople
  Jovan Vladimir
  St John Aliturgetos (Nesebar), Church of
  St John (Kaneo), Church of
  St John the Baptist (Asenovgrad), Church of
  St John the Baptist (Nesebar), Church of

K

  Kaliman I
  Kaliman II
  Kaloyan
  Kaloyan and Desislava
  Kanasubigi
  Kardam
  Katasyrtai, Battle of
  Kavhan
  Kera Tamara
  Keratsa of Bulgaria
  Keratsa Petritsa
  Kira Maria
  Kira Maria Asenina of Bulgaria
  Kleidion, Battle of
  Klokotnitsa, Battle of
  Klonimir
  Knyaz
  Konstantin and Fruzhin, Uprising of
  Kormesiy
  Kormisosh
  Kosara of Bulgaria
  Kozma Zografski
  Krakra of Pernik
  Krasen  
  Kreta, Battle of
  Krum
  Krum's dynasty
  Ktenia
  Kuber
  Kubrat
  Kutmichevitsa

L

  Lardea
  Latin Empire, Bulgarian wars with
  Leontius of Bulgaria
  Lovech, Siege of
  Lyutitsa  
  Lovech, Despotate of

M

  Macarius of Bulgaria
  Macedonia (theme)
  Macedonia (region)
  Macedonia (terminology)
  Madara Rider
  Malamir
  Malamirovo Inscription
  Marcellae (756), Battle of
  Marcellae (792), Battle of
  Maria
  Maria Asenina of Bulgaria
  Maria of Bulgaria, Latin Empress
  Maria-Irene Palaiologina
  Maria of Mangup
  Maria Palaiologina Kantakouzene
  Marina Smilets of Bulgaria
  Marko, Prince
  Marmais
  Markeli
  Matochina  
  Mauros
  Menumorut
  Messinipolis, Battle of
  Mezek  
  Michael II Asen
  Michael IV Asen
  Michael Shishman
  Michael of Bulgaria
  Michael (Bulgarian pretender)
  Miroslava of Bulgaria
  Mitso Asen
  Moesia
  Momchil
  Moses
  Mostich

N

  Naum of Preslav
  Neboulos
  Nesebar
  Nestoritsa
  St Nicholas (Melnik), Church of
  St Nicholas (Sapareva Banya), Church of
  Nikulitsa

O

  Ohrid
  Ohrid Literary School
  Old Church Slavonic
  Old Great Bulgaria
  Omurtag
  Omurtag's Tarnovo Inscription
  Ongal, Battle of
  Organa
  Ostrovo, Battle of
  Ottoman Empire, Bulgarian wars with

P

  Pagan
  St Panteleimon (Ohrid), Church of
  Palace of Omurtag
  St Paraskevi (Nesebar), Church of
  Pechenegs
  Pegae, Battle of
  Peter I
  Peter II
  Peter III
  Peter IV
  Peter Delyan, Uprising of
  Peter (diplomat)
  St Peter (Berende), Church of
  Saints Peter and Paul (Nikopol), Church of
  Saints Peter and Paul (Veliko Tarnovo), Church of
  Philippopolis (1208), Battle of
  Pirdop Apostle
  Plenimir
  Pliska
  Pliska, Battle of
  Pliska, Great Basilica of
  Pliska, Rosette from
  Preslav
  Preslav, Council of
  Preslav Literary School
  Preslav, Round Church of
  Preslav Treasure
  Presian I
  Presian (son of Ivan Vladislav)
  Presian Inscription
  Prespa (medieval town)

Q

R

  Rahovets
  Ratimir, Duke of Lower Pannonia
  Rila Monastery
  Rishki Pass, Battle of the
  Rodosto, Battle of
  Roman
  Romylos of Vidin
  Rostislav Mikhailovich
  Rostislav Stratimirovic
  Rusion, Battle of
  Rusokastro, Battle of

S

  Sabin
  Sagudates
  Saint Naum, Monastery of
  Saints Cyril and Methodius
  Salan
  Salonica (995), Battle of
  Salonica (1004), Battle of
  Salonica (1014), Battle of
  Salonica (1040), Battle of
  Salonica (2nd 1040), Battle of
  Samuel
  Samuil's Inscription
  Sandilch
  Sarah-Theodora
  Sava's book
  Sebastokrator
  Serbia, Bulgarian wars with 
  Serbia, 839–842 war with 
  Serbia, 853 war with 
  Serbia, 917–924 war with 
  Serdica (809), Siege of
  Sergius of Bulgaria
  Sermon (ruler)
  Serres (1196), Battle of
  Serres (1205), Battle of
  Setina, Battle of
  Sevar
  Seven Slavic tribes
  Severians
  Shishman
  Shishman dynasty
  Shishman of Vidin
  Shumen fortress 
  Silistra, Battle of
  Simeon I
  Sirmium, Theme of
  Sırp Sındığı, Battle of
  Slavs
  Slavs, South
  Skafida, Battle of
  Skopje
  Skopje, Battle of
  Smilets
  Smilets dynasty
  Smiltsena Palaiologina
  Smolyani
  Sofia Psalter
  St Sophia (Ohrid), Church of
  Southern Buh, Battle of
  Sratsimir
  Sratsimir dynasty
  St Stephen (Nesebar), Church of
  Strez
  Strumitsa, Battle of
  Strymon (theme)

T

  Tarnovo
  Tarnovo Artistic School, architecture
  Tarnovo Artistic School, painting
  Tarnovo Literary School
  Tarnovo Patriarchate
  Tarnovo, Siege of
  Telerig
  Telets
  Terter dynasty
  Tervel
  Tetraevangelia of Ivan Alexander
  Theodora Angelina (daughter of Isaac Komnenos)
  Theodora of Wallachia
  Theodora Palaiologina, Empress of Bulgaria
  Theodora Smilets of Bulgaria
  Theodore Sigritsa
  Theodore Svetoslav
  St Theodore (Boboshevo), Church of
  St Theodore (Nesebar), Church of
  Theodosius of Tarnovo
  Thessalonica (theme)
  Thrace
  Thrace (theme)
  Tihomir (Bulgarian noble)
  Timočani
  Tomić Psalter
  Toktu
  Treaty of 716, Byzantine–Bulgarian
  Treaty of 815, Byzantine–Bulgarian
  Tryavna, Battle of
  Tsar
  Tsarevets (fortress)
  Tsarina
  Tsepina

U

  Umor
  Urvich
  Ustra

V

  Václav Dobruský
  Varna (1201), Siege of
  Velbazhd, Battle of 
  Venedikov, Ivan
  Versinikia, Battle of
  Vidin
  Vidin, Hungarian occupation of
  Vinekh
  Viola, Duchess of Opole
  Vissarion of Bulgaria
  Vladimir-Rasate
  Vladislav the Grammarian
  Vonko

W
  Wallachia
  W.l.n.d.r, Battle of

X

Y
  Yanuka

Z

  Zabergan
  Zadar (998), Siege of
  Zemen Monastery
  Zlatarski, Vasil
  Zograf Monastery
  Zvinitsa

Lists
Bulgarian consorts
Bulgarian monarchs

Bulgarian Empire
.
.
Bulgarian Empire
Bulgarian Empire